The Association of Local Government Archaeological Officers, or ALGAO, functions as a body to represent archaeologists working for local authorities and national parks in the United Kingdom.   

ALGAO resulted from the merger of the Association of County Archaeological Officers (ACAO) and the Council of District Archaeological Officers (CDAO) in 1996.  These organisations, and consequently ALGAO, were centred on England and Wales.  This situation remained until ALGAO merged with the Association of Regional and Island Archaeologists (ARIA) in 2006, who until that point represented archaeologists performing similar duties in Scotland.

The organisations ALGAO:Cymru, ALGAO:Scotland, and ALGAO:England were formed to serve the constituent regions.

External links
Official site

Archaeological organizations
Archaeology of the United Kingdom
Local Government Archaeological Officers
Organizations established in 1996
1996 establishments in the United Kingdom